The MV Material Service was a steel-hulled American self-unloading, diesel-powered workbarge that sank with the loss of fifteen lives on Lake Michigan off the coast of North Township, Lake County, Indiana. On March 25, 2014 the wreck of the Material Service was listed on the National Register of Historic Places.

History
The Material Service (Official number 228371) was built as hull number #253 in 1929, in Sturgeon Bay, Wisconsin by the Leathem D. Smith Shipbuilding & Dry Dock Company, for the Leatham Smith-Putnam Navigation Company of Sturgeon Bay, Wisconsin, and she was on a ten-year lease to the Material Service Corporation of Chicago, Illinois. She had a gross register tonnage of 1,077 tons, and a net register tonnage of 736 tons. She was driven by two propellers that were powered by two  diesel engines.

She was built to carry sand from Lake Michigan to docks located in the Chicago River. Her shallow hull, and her lowerable A-frame were designed to permit passage under low bridges.

References

Barges of the United States
Shipwrecks of Lake Michigan
1929 ships
Wreck diving sites in the United States
Ships sunk in storms